The 1157 Hama earthquake occurred on 12 August after a year of foreshocks. Its name was taken from the city of Hama, in west-central Syria (then under the Seljuk rule), where the most casualties were sustained. In eastern Syria, near the Euphrates, the quake destroyed the predecessor of the citadel al-Rahba, subsequently rebuilt on the same strategic site. The earthquake also affected Christian monasteries and churches in the vicinity of Jerusalem.

See also 
 List of historical earthquakes
 Shaizar
 Timeline of Hama history
 Banu Munqidh

References 

1157 Hama
Hama earthquake
12th century in the Kingdom of Jerusalem
12th century in the Seljuk Empire
Hama Earthquake, 1157